Sira Station  is a railway station located at the village of Sira in Flekkefjord, Norway on the railway Sørlandet Line. The station is served by regional trains operated by Go-Ahead Norge to Stavanger and Kristiansand.

History
The station was opened in 1904 when the Jæren Line was extended from Egersund to Flekkefjord. In 1943 the current station was built when it became part of the Sørlandet Line, making Flekkefjord Line a branch line terminating at Sira.

Railway stations in Flekkefjord
Railway stations on the Sørlandet Line
Railway stations opened in 1904
1904 establishments in Norway